Hyoga may refer to:
 Cygnus Hyoga, a fictional character in the manga series Saint Seiya
 Hyoga (Dr. Stone), a character in the manga series Dr. Stone